Maria Psilou (Greek: Μαρία Ψηλού) (born 7 February 1997) is a Greek model and beauty pageant titleholder who was crowned Star Hellas 2017 and represented Greece at Miss World 2017 and Miss Supranational 2018 pageant.

Personal life
Psilou hails from Aigio, Greece. She studied philosophy at the University of Patras. On June 11, 2020, Psilou married Greek entrepreneur Konstantinos Psilos. On August 10, 2020, gave birth to their first child, a daughter.

Pageantry

Star Hellas 2017
Psilou was crowned Star Hellas 2017 and then competed at Miss World 2017.

Miss World 2017
Psilou represented Greece at Miss World 2017 but Unplaced.

Miss Supranational 2018
Psilou also represented Greece at Miss Supranational 2018 pageant in Poland.

References

External links
 Maria Psilou on Instagram

1997 births
Living people
Greek beauty pageant winners
Greek female models
Miss World 2017 delegates
People from Aigio